The Magdalenenfest is an annual end of summer 16-day festival in the Munich Hirschgarten. It is named after Mary Magdalene.

The Magdalenenfest dates back to the year 1728,  where in that year the Magdalenenklause opened in Schlosspark Nymphenburg (palace garden). On the patron saint's name day,  22 July, the Schlosspark and the Magdalenenklause were made available to the common people. At the Magdalenenklause, a small spring flows, which should help with eye diseases. The Magdalenenklause turned into a place of pilgrimage. 1790 the Schlosspark was opened permanently for the general public and it developed a carnival around the name day. Until 1930 the Magdalenenfest took place in the Schlosspark, then it was moved to the Romanplatz. In 1958, the festival was moved to the Hirschgarten.

References

External links 
 Magdalenenfest

German traditions
Festivals in Munich
Mary Magdalene